The Ditto drive series was a proprietary magnetic tape data storage system released by Iomega during the 1990s.  It was marketed as a backup device for personal computers.

They were released in several capacities ranging from the original Ditto 250 drive (250MB compressed capacity per cartridge) to the DittoMAX drive, a compatible format with compressed capacities up to 10GB per cartridge. This was accomplished by increasing the physical size of the cartridge (making it longer). Some versions of the drive were also able to read Travan-type tapes.

Technical aspects
Ditto internal drives were connected through the floppy drive channel and used MFM encoding to store data (the same method as on older floppy drives). An ISA accelerator card called the Ditto Dash, providing higher speed than a stock floppy controller,  was also available.

Ditto external drives were connected to the parallel port and offered a print-through port which allowed a printer to operate while daisy-chained to the Ditto drive. This is a feature also commonly found on an Iomega ZIP drive. Usage of the parallel port allowed for transfer speeds (in EPP mode) of a maximum 1 MB/s.

Discontinuation
In 1999, Iomega sold the Ditto brand and technology to Tecmar and exited the tape drive business.

The Ditto series has been discontinued. The need for higher capacities has made the Ditto series obsolete. The slow bandwidth of the Ditto also limited its usefulness compared to the Iomega REV or the older (and discontinued) Iomega Jaz.

Models 
 Tape 250 - Released in 1992. Compatible with Irwin's EZTape

Compatibility between tapes and drives 

Notes:
R - read capable
W - write capable
F - format capable
 The capacity figures used in the product names above are double the actual (native) capacity.  Iomega and other manufacturers assume 2:1 data compression.
 Ditto Max requires version 3.2 Pro of the Iomega backup software to support the Ditto Max 10GB tape cartridge.
 Above data gathered from.

See also 
 Tape drive

References

External links
  Tape Standards and Compatibility for the Ditto drive

Computer storage tape media
Iomega storage devices